Erinella is a genus of fungi belonging to the family Hyaloscyphaceae.

Species

Species:

Erinella aspidiicola
Erinella callimorpha
Erinella calyculiformis

References

Hyaloscyphaceae
Helotiales genera